Clarence F. Manbeck (September 21, 1908 – May 14, 1991) was a  Republican member of the Pennsylvania State Senate, serving from 1969 to 1982. He also served in the Pennsylvania House of Representatives.

Manbeck founded Farmers Pride in 1939, selling chickens in Ohio and Pennsylvania. He sold the business in the 1980s.
A bridge in Bethel Township, Lebanon County is named the Senator Clarence F. Manbeck Bridge.

References

Republican Party Pennsylvania state senators
Republican Party members of the Pennsylvania House of Representatives
1908 births
1991 deaths
20th-century American politicians